Oblivsky District is an administrative and municipal district (raion), one of the forty-three in Rostov Oblast, Russia. It is located in the northeast of the oblast. Its administrative center is the rural locality (a stanitsa) of Oblivskaya. Population: 18,872 (2010 Census);  The population of Oblivskaya accounts for 52.5% of the district's total population.

Demographics
In the 2002 Census, 30.34% (5,816 out of 19,167) of the total population of Oblivsky District registered themselves as "Cossack" in the ethnicity column, the highest proportion anywhere in Russia.

References

Notes

Sources

Districts of Rostov Oblast

